The 2019-20 Bangladesh Premier League players draft took place in 17 November 2017.

During the player's direct signing period, a Conflict of Interests aroused between BCB and all other franchise. Subsequently, in September BCB President Nazmul Hasan Papon informed the media about certain changes in rules and regulations for the ongoing season and eliminating all franchises, BCB took over the charge of the current BPL and decided to run this current tournament by the board itself and named the tournament as Bangabandhu BPL T20 2019 in order to pay homage to Sheikh Mujibur Rahman on his birth centenary.

On 16 November 2019, BCB unveiled the logo and name of the all seven teams for the current season. 5 out of 7 teams were sponsored by private companies while Rangpur Rangers and Cumilla Warriors are sponsored by BCB itself.
Chattogram Challengers is sponsored by Akhtar Furnishers, Dhaka Platoon is sponsored by Jamuna Bank, Khulna Tigers is sponsored by Premier Bank Limited, Rajshahi Royals by IPC Group and Sylhet Thunder is sponsored by Jivani Footwear Company.
 
The players auction for the 2019 Bangabandhu BPL T20 was held on 17 November 2019 at the Hotel Radisson, Dhaka. A total of 181 domestic players and 439 foreign players signed up for the players' draft.

Rules for players' draft
BCB set some rules for players' draft. Those are-

 Each team can buy a minimum of 9 domestic and 6 foreign players.
 Any team can not buy more than 19 players, 11 being domestic and 8 foreign.
 Each team can make direct signing of maximum 2 foreign players outside of draft.
 Each team can buy 1 domestic A+ category player, but there only 4 player being listed in A+ category, other teams, who were not able to buy A+ category player, can buy maximum 2 A category player instead of A+.
 Each team can buy maximum 1 player from A category, 3 each from B and C category, and 2 each from D and E category.
 Each team has to buy a pacer who can bowl at a speed of 140 km/h or more.
 Each team has to include a Leg-spinner.

Draft Summary
A total of 620 player, 181 domestic and 439 foreign players from 22 nations signed up for draft.

Salary Cap
Domestic players were divided into 6 categories while Foreign players were divided into 5 categories.

Domestic players
 A+ –  (4)
 A –  (9)
 B –  (24)
 C –  (41)
 D –  (59)
 E –  (44)

 Foreign players
 A+ – 100,000 (11)
 A – 70,000 (15)
 B – 50,000 (66)
 C – 30,000 (75)
 D – 20,000 (272)

Players' list
 Domestic players were divided into 6 category, 4 players were in the A+ category, 9 players in A Category, 24 players were in B category, 41 cricketers were in C category, 59 players in D category and 44 cricketers were allotted to E category.
 Foreign players were divided into 5 category, A+ category contains 11 players, A category 15, B category 66, C category 75 and D category contains 272 players

Domestic players
Domestic players with A+, A, B and C category are listed here.

A+ Category (50 lakh)

  Mashrafe Mortaza
  Mushfiqur Rahim
  Tamim Iqbal
  Mahmudullah

A Category (25 lakh)

  Mosaddek Hossain
  Mustafizur Rahman
  Soumya Sarkar
  Mehedi Hasan Miraz
  Liton Das
  Taijul Islam
  Imrul Kayes
  Mominul Haque
  Mohammad Mithun

B Category (18 lakh)

  Abu Haider
  Sabbir Rahman
  Afif Hossain
  Anamul Haque
  Rubel Hossain
  Abu Jayed
  Taskin Ahmed
  Shafiul Islam
  Nazmul Hossain Shanto
  Shuvagata Hom
  Nurul Hasan
  Jahurul Islam
  Farhad Reza
  Al-Amin Hossain
  Mehedi Hasan
  Fazle Mahmud Rabbi
  Yasir Ali
  Rony Talukdar
  Ariful Haque
  Nazmul Islam
  Sunzamul Islam
  Nayeem Hasan
  Al- Amin
  Kamrul Islam Rabbi

C Category (12 lakh)

  Mohammad Naim
  Mohammad Ashraful
  Shahriar Nafees
  Ebadot Hossain
  Subashis Roy
  Alok Kapali
  Sohag Gazi
  Junaid Siddique
  Shamsur Rahman
  Khaled Ahmed
  Arafat Sunny
  Tanbir Hayder
  Saikat Ali
  Marshal Ayub
  Mahmudul Hasan
  Abdul Majid
  Nadif Chowdhury
  Irfan Sukkur
  Saif Hassan
  Sharifullah
  Delwar Hossain
  Monir Hossain
  Ziaur Rahman
  Muktar Ali
  Alauddin Babu
  Suhrawadi Shuvo
  Naeem Islam
  Rakibul Hasan
  Saqlain Sajib
  Mehedi Hasan Rana
  Nahidul Islam
  Shahidul Islam
  Robiul Haque
  Qazi Onik
  Zakir Hasan
  Jaker Ali
  Nasir Hossain
  Mosharraf Hossain
  Abdur Razzak
  Shadman Islam

Foreign players
Foreign players with A+, A and B category players are listed below

A+ Category (100,000)

  Dane Vilas
  Shahid Afridi
  Rilee Rossouw
  Hassan Ali
  Mohammad Nabi
  Shoaib Malik
  Mujeeb Ur Rahman
  Chris Gayle
  Thisara Perera
  Dwayne Smith
  Darren Bravo

A Category (70,000)

  Isuru Udana
  Ravi Bopara
  Mohammad Amir
  Kemar Roach
  Marlon Samuels
  Mohammad Hafeez
  Dimuth Karunaratne
  Kusal Perera
  Mohammad Hasnain
  Rassie van der Dussen
  Shai Hope
  Wayne Parnell
  Fakhar Zaman
  Oshane Thomas
  Sam Billings

B Category (50,000)

  Niroshan Dickwella
  Kyle Abbott
  Hardus Viljoen
  David Wiese
  JP Duminy
  Ahmed Shehzad
  Mohammad Nawaz
  Samit Patel
  Keaton Jennings
  Steven Finn
  Sheldon Cottrell
  Benny Howell
  Dawid Malan
  Imran Khan
  Sami Aslam
  Bilawal Bhatti
  Azeem Rafiq
  Imad Wasim
  Wahab Riaz
  Danny Briggs
  Laurie Evans
  Matt Parkinson
  Avishka Fernando
  Dasun Shanaka
  Kusal Mendis
  Danushka Gunathilaka
  Simon Harmer
  Ed Pollock
  Matt Critchley
  Joe Clarke
  Cameron Delport
  Kamran Akmal
  Zahir Khan
  Mohammad Shahzad
  Craig Overton
  Asghar Afghan
  Asif Ali
  Jade Dernbach
  Asela Gunaratne
  Upul Tharanga
  Wanindu Hasaranga
  Dhananjaya de Silva
  Mohammad Irfan
  Naseem Shah
  Luke Fletcher
  Jamie Porter
  Lewis Gregory
  Will Jacks
  Rahkeem Cornwall
  Ali Khan
  Shannon Gabriel
  Tymal Mills
  Gulbadin Naib
  Denesh Ramdin
  Sherfane Rutherford
  Brendan Taylor
  Ryan ten Doeschate
  Riki Wessels
  Hazratullah Zazai
  Robbie Frylinck
  Steven Mullaney
  Paul Coughlin
  Andre Fletcher
  Devendra Bishoo
  Rovman Powell
  Dwaine Pretorius
  Tabraiz Shamsi

Sold Players
 
List of players bought in the draft.

Direct signings

Note: Grade and Base Prices to Direct signed players may not be applicable. It is given here to show that whether the particular player signed up for the draft or not.

See also
 2019–20 Bangladesh Premier League

Notes

References

2019–20 Bangladesh Premier League